"Break Your Heart" is a 2009 Taio Cruz song.

Break Your Heart may also refer to:

 "Break Your Heart" (Natalie Merchant song), 1998
 "Break Your Heart", a Trixie Mattel song from One Stone, 2018
 "Break Your Heart", a Todrick Hall song from Forbidden, 2018

See also 
 Break My Heart (disambiguation)